Hay Mohammadi or Hay Mohammedi is an arrondissement of eastern Casablanca, in the Aïn Sebaâ - Hay Mohammadi district of the Casablanca-Settat region of Morocco. As of 2004 it had 156,501 inhabitants.

The district was once home to North Africa's oldest and largest slum, formerly known as Carrières Centrales, which was largely demolished throughout the 2010s.

Notable residents
Larbi Batma - Singer
Dounia Batma 
Hasnaa Bouhadda
Salma Rachid
Nass El Ghiwane

References

Arrondissements of Casablanca